Joshelay is an Indian web series created by Vinayak Joshi.<ref>{{citation|url=https://www.deccanherald.com/metrolife/i-want-everybody-auto-driver-692631.html|title='I want everybody to watch'Joshelay|date=2018-09-16|work=Deccan Herald}}</ref> This Kannada series is a compilation of many inspirational stories from across the country. The protagonist runs  for 50 days and narrates inspirational stories of 28 people who are physically and mentally disabled. The web series is available online on several online platforms free of charge, including YouTube and Facebook.

Cast
 Vinayak Joshi
 Pradip Sinha
 Prabhakar Rao 
 Charan Gowda Hassan
 Deepak Sridhar
 Srikanth Indira
 Srikanth 
 Kristishan 
 Jayanth Jeevith
 Chandan Shetty (cameo) Duttanna
 Master Shouryaa Anand
 Anand Yediyur
 Madhusudhan
 Elvis Joseph
 Vilas Nayak
 Manjunath
 Mahesh Londhe
 Sundarashree
 Viraat as Jeeva Suhas Karanth as Kinka short form of Yama Kinkara
 Vasu Dixit as Jaawa'' a halegannada name for Yamaraj
 Reena Raju
 Rohith Bhanuprakash
 Dr. K.B.Linge Gowda
 Sundarashree
 Chandrakala S V
 Sujith Venkataramaiah
 Nanda Gopal
 Vikram Attavar
 Raksha Jayaraj 
 Master Atharva Venkataramaih
 Priyanka Sujith

Episodes

Soundtrack

The soundtrack album consists of seven tracks. The soundtrack and background score were composed by Dossmode while one song is composed by Chandan Shetty. The lyrics are by Sujith Venkataramaiah, Chandan Shetty and Vinayak Joshi.

References

2010s YouTube series
2018 web series debuts
Kannada-language web series
Indian drama web series
Non-fiction web series